Myxococcus is a genus of bacteria in the family Myxococcaceae. Myxococci are Gram-negative, spore-forming, chemoorganotrophic, obligate aerobes. They are elongated rods with rounded or tapered ends, and they are nonflagellated. The cells move by gliding and can predate other bacteria. The genus has been isolated from soil. 

At least eleven species had been identified with confidence by late 2020 and each had been characterised to some extent. As well as using traditional biochemical tests, strains of some species had been compared using whole genome sequences. This approach has provided evidence that the genus, like most bacterial genera, has a core set of genes found in all members of the genus, along with others that are confined to particular species. The identity of Myxococcus species therefore continues to change. An example where taxonomy may be changed is that comparisons of genome sequences and biochemical tests indicated that M. xanthus and M. virescens were not distinguishable.

Sources
"Myxococcus - Information on Myxococcus - Encyclopedia of Life." Encyclopedia of Life. Encyclopedia of Life, n.d. Web. 15 Dec. 2014.

Phylogeny
The currently accepted taxonomy is based on the List of Prokaryotic names with Standing in Nomenclature (LPSN) and National Center for Biotechnology Information (NCBI)

See also 
 List of bacterial orders
 List of bacteria genera

References

Myxococcota
Bacteria genera